The 1916 Argentine Primera División was the 25th season of top-flight football in Argentina. The season began on March 23 and ended on December.

Racing win its 4th consecutive league championship.

Final standings

References

Argentine Primera División seasons
1916 in Argentine football
1916 in South American football